Andris Teikmanis (29 November 1959; Riga, Latvia) is a Latvian lawyer, politician, and diplomat. He served as first post-soviet Mayor of Riga from 1990 to 1994. In September 2016 he was accredited as the Latvian ambassador to the United States. He previously served as Under Secretary in the Ministry of Foreign Affairs in Riga, and as Latvian ambassador to the Council of Europe, to the Russian Federation, to Germany, and to the United Kingdom, and as non-resident ambassador to Australia and New Zealand.
Since August 2019 A. Teikmanis is head of the Chancellery of the President of Latvia Egils Levits.

References

External links 

Andris Teikmanis at Ministry of Foreign Affairs of the Republic of Latvia

1959 births
Living people
Diplomats from Riga
Popular Front of Latvia politicians
Deputies of the Supreme Council of the Republic of Latvia
Mayors of Riga
Ambassadors of Latvia to Germany
Ambassadors of Latvia to Russia
Ambassadors of Latvia to the United Kingdom
Ambassadors of Latvia to the United States
Ambassadors of Latvia to Australia
Ambassadors of Latvia to New Zealand
Recipients of the Order of the Cross of Terra Mariana, 2nd Class
Grand Crosses with Star and Sash of the Order of Merit of the Federal Republic of Germany